Khosta railway station is a railway station of the North Caucasus Railway, a subsidiary of Russian Railways, located in Khosta, Khostinsky City District of Sochi, Krasnodar Krai, Russia.

The station was built between 1961 and 1963 and sits on the Sochi–Adler section of the Tuapse–Sukhum railway. The station has three tracks, all of which can serve electric locomotives. There are three platforms connected by a pedestrian subway tunnel. In 2012 the station was renovated and now has carriage-level platforms and mobility access.

The station is situated next to the beach and partially under the coastal highway.

References

Railway stations in Sochi
Railway stations in Russia opened in 1963